Namju (also Romanized as Nāmjū) is a village in Kuhdasht-e Shomali Rural District, in the Central District of Kuhdasht County, Lorestan Province, Iran. At the 2006 census, its population was 350, in 57 families.

References 

Towns and villages in Kuhdasht County